Opson is an important category in Ancient Greek foodways.
First and foremost opson refers to a major division of ancient Greek food: the 'relish' that complements the sitos (σίτος) the staple part of the meal, i.e. wheat or barley.

Opson is therefore equivalent to  Banchan in Korean cuisine and Okazu in Japanese cuisine.
Because it was considered the more pleasurable part of any meal, opson was the subject of some anxiety among ancient Greek moralists, who coined the term opsophagia to describe the vice of those who took too much opson with their sitos.

Although any kind of complement to the staple, even salt, could be categorized as opson, the term was also commonly used to refer to the most esteemed kind of relish: fish.  Hence a diminutive of opson, opsarion (ὀψάριον), provides the modern Greek word for fish: psari (ψάρι), and the term opsophagos, literally 'opson-eater', is almost always used by classical authors to refer to men who are fanatical about seafood, e.g. Philoxenus of Leucas.

Finally, opson can be used to mean a 'prepared dish' (plural opsa). Plato, probably mistakenly, derived the word from the verb ἕψω ― 'to boil'.

The central focus of Greek personal morality on self-control made opsophagia a matter of concern for moralists and satirists in the classical period.  The complicated semantics of the word opson and its derivatives made the word a matter of concern for Atticists during the Second Sophistic.

References

Ancient Greek cuisine
Greek cuisine
Historical foods